North Eastern Electricity Board was an electricity distribution utility in England, serving the North East of England.

History
Formed as the North Eastern Electricity Board (NEEB) in 1948 as part of the nationalisation of the electricity industry by the Electricity Act 1947, it was privatised in 1990 and renamed as Northern Electric.

Nationalised industry 
The NEEB was responsible for the purchase of electricity from the electricity generator (the Central Electricity Generating Board from 1958) and its distribution and sale of electricity to customers. The key people on the Board were: Chairman G.M. Green (1964, 1967), Deputy Chairman E. Bates (1964, 1967), Full time member J. F. Skipsey (1964).

The total number of customers supplied by the Board was:

The amount of electricity, in GWh, sold by North Eastern Electricity Board over its operational life was:

Fleet vehicles

The NEEB transport fleet was easily identified by its distinctive orange colour and company logo.

References

 National Archives

Electric power companies of the United Kingdom
Utilities of the United Kingdom